Neanderthals (Homo neanderthalensis or H. sapiens neanderthalensis), also written as Neandertals, are an extinct species or subspecies of archaic humans who lived in Eurasia until about 40,000 years ago. The reasons for Neanderthal extinction are disputed, theories include demographic factors such as small population size and inbreeding; competitive replacement; interbreeding and assimilation with modern humans; climate change; disease; or a combination of these factors.

It is unclear when the line of Neanderthals split from that of modern humans; studies have produced various intervals ranging from 315,000 to more than 800,000 years ago. The date of divergence of Neanderthals from their ancestor H. heidelbergensis is also unclear. The oldest potential Neanderthal bones date to 430,000 years ago, but the classification remains uncertain. Neanderthals are known from numerous fossils, especially from after 130,000 years ago. The type specimen, Neanderthal 1, was found in 1856 in the Neander Valley in present-day Germany. For much of the early 20th century, European researchers depicted Neanderthals as primitive, unintelligent, and brutish. Although knowledge and perception of them has markedly changed since then in the scientific community, the image of the unevolved caveman archetype remains prevalent in popular culture.

Neanderthal technology was quite sophisticated. It includes the Mousterian stone-tool industry and ability to create fire and build cave hearths, make the adhesive birch bark tar, craft at least simple clothes similar to blankets and ponchos, weave, go seafaring through the Mediterranean, and make use of medicinal plants, as well as treat severe injuries, store food, and use various cooking techniques such as roasting, boiling, and smoking. Neanderthals made use of a wide array of food, mainly hoofed mammals, but also other megafauna, plants, small mammals, birds, and aquatic and marine resources. Although they were probably apex predators, they still competed with cave bears, cave lions, cave hyenas, and other large predators. A number of examples of symbolic thought and Palaeolithic art have been inconclusively attributed to Neanderthals, namely possible ornaments made from bird claws and feathers or shells, collections of unusual objects including crystals and fossils, engravings, music production (possibly indicated by the Divje Babe flute), and Spanish cave paintings contentiously dated to before 65,000 years ago. Some claims of religious beliefs have been made. Neanderthals were likely capable of speech, possibly articulate, although the complexity of their language is not known.

Compared with modern humans, Neanderthals had a more robust build and proportionally shorter limbs. Researchers often explain these features as adaptations to conserve heat in a cold climate, but they may also have been adaptations for sprinting in the warmer, forested landscape that Neanderthals often inhabited. Nonetheless, they had cold-specific adaptations, such as specialised body-fat storage and an enlarged nose to warm air (although the nose could have been caused by genetic drift). The Neanderthal skull was more elongated and the brain had smaller parietal lobes and cerebellum, but larger temporal, occipital, and orbitofrontal regions.

The total population of Neanderthals remained low, proliferating weakly harmful gene variants and precluding effective long-distance networks. Despite this, there is evidence of regional cultures and thus of regular communication between communities. They may have frequented caves and moved between them seasonally. Neanderthals lived in a high-stress environment with high trauma rates, and about 80% died before the age of 40. The 2010 Neanderthal genome project's draft report presented evidence for interbreeding between Neanderthals and modern humans. It possibly occurred 316,000 to 219,000 years ago, but more likely 100,000 years ago and again 65,000 years ago. Neanderthals also appear to have interbred with Denisovans, a different group of archaic humans, in Siberia. Around 1–4% of genomes of Eurasians, Indigenous Australians, Melanesians,
Native Americans, and North Africans is of Neanderthal ancestry, while the inhabitants of sub-Saharan Africa have only 0.3% of Neanderthal genes, save possible traces from early sapiens-to-Neanderthal gene flow and/or more recent back-migration of Eurasians to Africa. In all, about 20% of distinctly Neanderthal gene variants survive today. Although many of the gene variants inherited from Neanderthals may have been detrimental and selected out, Neanderthal introgression appears to have affected the modern human immune system,
and is also implicated in several other biological functions and structures, but a large portion appears to be non-coding DNA.

Taxonomy

Etymology

Neanderthals are named after the Neandertal Valley in which the first identified specimen was found. The valley was spelled Neanderthal and the species was spelled Neanderthaler in German until the spelling reform of 1901. The spelling Neandertal for the species is occasionally seen in English, even in scientific publications, but the scientific name, H. neanderthalensis, is always spelled with th according to the principle of priority. The vernacular name of the species in German is always Neandertaler ("inhabitant of the Neander Valley"), whereas Neandertal always refers to the valley. The valley itself was named after the late 17th century German theologian and hymn writer Joachim Neander, who often visited the area. His name in turn means ‘new man’, being a learned Graecization of the German surname Neumann.

Neanderthal 1, the type specimen, was known as the "Neanderthal cranium" or "Neanderthal skull" in anthropological literature, and the individual reconstructed on the basis of the skull was occasionally called "the Neanderthal man". The binomial name Homo neanderthalensis—extending the name "Neanderthal man" from the individual specimen to the entire species, and formally recognising it as distinct from humans—was first proposed by Irish geologist William King in a paper read to the 33rd British Science Association in 1863. However, in 1864, he recommended that Neanderthals and modern humans be classified in different genera as he compared the Neanderthal braincase to that of a chimpanzee and argued that they were "incapable of moral and [theistic] conceptions".

Research history

The first Neanderthal remains—Engis 2 (a skull)—were discovered in 1829 by Dutch naturalist Philippe-Charles Schmerling in the Grottes d'Engis, Belgium, but he thought it was a fossil modern human skull. In 1848, Gibraltar 1 from Forbes' Quarry was presented to the Gibraltar Scientific Society by their Secretary Lieutenant Edmund Henry Réné Flint, but was also thought to be a modern human skull. In 1856, local schoolteacher Johann Carl Fuhlrott recognised bones from Kleine Feldhofer Grotte in Neander Valley—Neanderthal 1 (the holotype specimen)—as distinct from modern humans, and gave them to German anthropologist Hermann Schaaffhausen to study in 1857. It comprised the cranium, thigh bones, right arm, left humerus and ulna, left ilium (hip bone), part of the right shoulder blade, and pieces of the ribs. Following Charles Darwin's On the Origin of Species, Fuhlrott and Schaaffhausen argued the bones represented an ancient modern human form; Schaaffhausen, a social Darwinist, believed that humans linearly progressed from savage to civilised, and so concluded that Neanderthals were barbarous cave-dwellers. Fuhlrott and Schaaffhausen met opposition namely from the prolific pathologist Rudolf Virchow who argued against defining new species based on only a single find. In 1872, Virchow erroneously interpreted Neanderthal characteristics as evidence of senility, disease, and malformation instead of archaicness, which stalled Neanderthal research until the end of the century.

By the early 20th century, numerous other Neanderthal discoveries were made, establishing H. neanderthalensis as a legitimate species. The most influential specimen was La Chapelle-aux-Saints 1 ("The Old Man") from La Chapelle-aux-Saints, France. French palaeontologist Marcellin Boule authored several publications, among the first to establish palaeontology as a science, detailing the specimen, but reconstructed him as slouching, ape-like, and only remotely related to modern humans. The 1912 'discovery' of Piltdown Man (a hoax), appearing much more similar to modern humans than Neanderthals, was used as evidence that multiple different and unrelated branches of primitive humans existed, and supported Boule's reconstruction of H. neanderthalensis as a far distant relative and an evolutionary dead-end. He fuelled the popular image of Neanderthals as barbarous, slouching, club-wielding primitives; this image was reproduced for several decades and popularised in science fiction works, such as the 1911 The Quest for Fire by J.-H. Rosny aîné and the 1927 The Grisly Folk by H. G. Wells where they are depicted as monsters. In 1911, Scottish anthropologist Arthur Keith reconstructed La Chapelle-aux-Saints 1 as an immediate precursor to modern humans, sitting next to a fire, producing tools, wearing a necklace, and having a more humanlike posture, but this failed to garner much scientific rapport, and Keith later abandoned his thesis in 1915.

By the middle of the century, based on the exposure of Piltdown Man as a hoax as well as a reexamination of La Chapelle-aux-Saints 1 (who had osteoarthritis which caused slouching in life) and new discoveries, the scientific community began to rework its understanding of Neanderthals. Ideas such as Neanderthal behaviour, intelligence, and culture were being discussed, and a more humanlike image of them emerged. In 1939, American anthropologist Carleton Coon reconstructed a Neanderthal in a modern business suit and hat to emphasise that they would be, more or less, indistinguishable from modern humans had they survived into the present. William Golding's 1955 novel The Inheritors depicts Neanderthals as much more emotional and civilised. However, Boule's image continued to influence works until the 1960s. In modern-day, Neanderthal reconstructions are often very humanlike.

Hybridisation between Neanderthals and early modern humans had been suggested early on, such as by English anthropologist Thomas Huxley in 1890, Danish ethnographer Hans Peder Steensby in 1907, and Coon in 1962. In the early 2000s, supposed hybrid specimens were discovered: Lagar Velho 1 and Muierii 1. However, similar anatomy could also have been caused by adapting to a similar environment rather than interbreeding. Neanderthal admixture was found to be present in modern populations in 2010 with the mapping of the first Neanderthal genome sequence. This was based on 3 specimens in Vindija Cave, Croatia, which contained almost 4% archaic DNA (allowing for near complete sequencing of the genome). However, there was approximately 1 error for every 200 letters (base pairs) based on the implausibly high mutation rate, probably due to the preservation of the sample. In 2012, British-American geneticist Graham Coop hypothesised that they instead found evidence of a different archaic human species interbreeding with modern humans, which was disproven in 2013 by the sequencing of a high-quality Neanderthal genome preserved in a toe bone from Denisova Cave, Siberia.

Classification

Neanderthals are hominids in the genus Homo, humans, and generally classified as a distinct species, H. neanderthalensis, although sometimes as a subspecies of modern human as H. sapiens neanderthalensis. This would necessitate the classification of modern humans as H. sapiens sapiens.

A large part of the controversy stems from the vagueness of the term "species", as it is generally used to distinguish two genetically isolated populations, but admixture between modern humans and Neanderthals is known to have occurred. However, the absence of Neanderthal-derived patrilineal Y-chromosome and matrilineal mitochondrial DNA (mtDNA) in modern humans, along with the underrepresentation of Neanderthal X chromosome DNA, could imply reduced fertility or frequent sterility of some hybrid crosses, representing a partial biological reproductive barrier between the groups, and therefore species distinction. In 2014 geneticist Svante Pääbo summarised the controversy, describing such "taxonomic wars" as unresolvable, "since there is no definition of species perfectly describing the case".

Neanderthals are thought to have been more closely related to Denisovans than to modern humans. Likewise, Neanderthals and Denisovans share a more recent last common ancestor (LCA) than to modern humans, based on nuclear DNA (nDNA). However, Neanderthals and modern humans share a more recent mitochondrial LCA (observable by studying mtDNA). This likely resulted from an interbreeding event subsequent to the Neanderthal/Denisovan split which introduced another mtDNA line. This involved either introgression coming from an unknown archaic human into Denisovans, or introgression from an earlier unidentified modern human wave from Africa into Neanderthals.

Evolution

It is largely thought that H. heidelbergensis was the last common ancestor of Neanderthals, Denisovans, and modern humans before populations became isolated in Europe, Asia, and Africa, respectively. The taxonomic distinction between H. heidelbergensis and Neanderthals is mostly based on a fossil gap in Europe between 300 and 243 thousand years ago during marine isotope stage 8. "Neanderthals", by convention, are fossils which date to after this gap. However, 430,000-year old bones at Sima de los Huesos could represent early Neanderthals or a closely related group, and the 400,000-year old Aroeira 3 could represent a transitional phase. Ancestral and derived morphs could have lived concurrently. It is also possible that there was gene flow between Western Europe and Africa during the Middle Pleistocene, obscuring Neanderthal characteristics in such specimens, namely from Ceprano, Italy, and Sićevo Gorge, Serbia. The fossil record is much more complete from 130,000 years ago onwards, and specimens from this period make up the bulk of known Neanderthal skeletons. Dental remains from the Italian Visogliano and Fontana Ranuccio sites indicate that Neanderthal dental features had evolved by around 450–430 thousand years ago during the Middle Pleistocene.

There are two main hypotheses regarding the evolution of Neanderthals following the Neanderthal/human split: two-phase and accretion. Two-phase argues that a single major environmental event—such as the Saale glaciation—caused European H. heidelbergensis to increase rapidly in body size and robustness, as well as undergoing a lengthening of the head (phase 1), which then led to other changes in skull anatomy (phase 2). However, Neanderthal anatomy may not have been driven entirely by adapting to cold weather. Accretion holds that Neanderthals slowly evolved over time from the ancestral H. heidelbergensis, divided into four stages: early-pre-Neanderthals (MIS 12, Elster glaciation), pre-Neanderthals sensu lato (MIS 11–9, Holstein interglacial), early Neanderthals (MIS 7–5, Saale glaciation–Eemian), and classic Neanderthals sensu stricto (MIS 4–3, Würm glaciation).

Numerous dates for the Neanderthal/human split have been suggested. The date of around 250,000 years ago cites "H. helmei" as being the last common ancestor (LCA), and the split is associated with the Levallois technique of making stone tools. The date of about 400,000 years ago uses H. heidelbergensis as the LCA. Estimates of 600,000 years ago assume that "H. rhodesiensis" was the LCA, which split off into modern human lineage and a Neanderthal/H. heidelbergensis lineage. 800,000 years ago has H. antecessor as the LCA, but different variations of this model would push the date back to 1 million years ago. However, a 2020 analysis of H. antecessor enamel proteomes suggests that H. antecessor is related but not a direct ancestor. DNA studies have yielded various results for the Neanderthal/human divergence time, such as 538–315, 553–321, 565–503, 654–475, 690–550, 765–550, 741–317, and 800–520 thousand years ago; and a dental analysis concluded before 800,000 years ago.

Neanderthals and Denisovans are more closely related to each other than they are to modern humans, meaning the Neanderthal/Denisovan split occurred after their split with modern humans. Assuming a mutation rate of 1 × 10−9 or 0.5 × 10−9 per base pair (bp) per year, the Neanderthal/Denisovan split occurred around either 236–190 or 473–381 thousand years ago respectively. Using 1.1 × 10−8 per generation with a new generation every 29 years, the time is 744,000 years ago. Using 5 × 10−10 nucleotide sites per year, it is 616,000 years ago. Using the latter dates, the split had likely already occurred by the time hominins spread out across Europe, and unique Neanderthal features had begun evolving by 600–500 thousand years ago. Before splitting, Neanderthal/Denisovans (or "Neandersovans") migrating out of Africa into Europe apparently interbred with an unidentified "superarchaic" human species who were already present there; these superarchaics were the descendants of a very early migration out of Africa around 1.9 mya.

Demographics

Range

Pre- and early Neanderthals, living before the Eemian interglacial (130,000 years ago), are poorly known and come mostly from Western European sites. From 130,000 years ago onwards, the quality of the fossil record increases dramatically with classic Neanderthals, who are recorded from Western, Central, Eastern, and Mediterranean Europe, as well as Southwest, Central, and Northern Asia up to the Altai Mountains in southern Siberia. Pre- and early Neanderthals, on the other hand, seem to have continuously occupied only France, Spain, and Italy, although some appear to have moved out of this "core-area" to form temporary settlements eastward (although without leaving Europe). Nonetheless, southwestern France has the highest density of sites for pre-, early, and classic Neanderthals.

The southernmost find was recorded at Shuqba Cave, Levant; reports of Neanderthals from the North African Jebel Irhoud and Haua Fteah have been reidentified as H. sapiens. Their easternmost presence is recorded at Denisova Cave, Siberia 85°E; the southeast Chinese Maba Man, a skull, shares several physical attributes with Neanderthals, although these may be the result of convergent evolution rather than Neanderthals extending their range to the Pacific Ocean. The northernmost bound is generally accepted to have been 55°N, with unambiguous sites known between 50–53°N, although this is difficult to assess because glacial advances destroy most human remains, and palaeoanthropologist Trine Kellberg Nielsen has argued that a lack of evidence of Southern Scandinavian occupation is (at least during the Eemian interglacial) due to the former explanation and a lack of research in the area. Middle Palaeolithic artefacts have been found up to 60°N on the Russian plains, but these are more likely attributed to modern humans. A 2017 study claimed the presence of Homo at the 130,000 year old Californian Cerutti Mastodon site in North America, but this is largely considered implausible.

It is unknown how the rapidly fluctuating climate of the last glacial period (Dansgaard–Oeschger events) impacted Neanderthals, as warming periods would produce more favourable temperatures but encourage forest growth and deter megafauna, whereas frigid periods would produce the opposite. However, Neanderthals may have preferred a forested landscape. Populations may have peaked in cold but not extreme intervals, such as marine isotope stages 8 and 6 (respectively 300 and 191 thousand years ago during the Saale glaciation). It is possible their range expanded and contracted as the ice retreated and grew respectively to avoid permafrost areas, residing in certain refuge zones during glacial maxima. In 2021, Israeli anthropologist Israel Hershkovitz and colleagues suggested the 140 to 120 thousand years old Israeli Nesher Ramla remains, which feature a mix of Neanderthal and more ancient H. erectus traits, represent one such source population which recolonised Europe following a glacial period.

Population
Like modern humans, Neanderthals probably descended from a very small population with an effective population—the number of individuals who can bear or father children—of 3,000 to 12,000 approximately. However, Neanderthals maintained this very low population, proliferating weakly harmful genes due to the reduced effectivity of natural selection.
Various studies, using mtDNA analysis, yield varying effective populations, such as about 1,000 to 5,000; 5,000 to 9,000 remaining constant; or 3,000 to 25,000 steadily increasing until 52,000 years ago before declining until extinction. Archaeological evidence suggests that there was a tenfold increase in the modern human population in Western Europe during the period of the Neanderthal/modern human transition, and Neanderthals may have been at a demographic disadvantage due to a lower fertility rate, a higher infant mortality rate, or a combination of the two. Estimates giving a total population in the higher tens of thousands are contested. A consistently low population may be explained in the context of the "Boserupian Trap": a population's carrying capacity is limited by the amount of food it can obtain, which in turn is limited by its technology. Innovation increases with population, but if the population is too low, innovation will not occur very rapidly and the population will remain low. This is consistent with the apparent 150,000 year stagnation in Neanderthal lithic technology.

In a sample of 206 Neanderthals, based on the abundance of young and mature adults in comparison to other age demographics, about 80% of them above the age of 20 died before reaching 40. This high mortality rate was probably due to their high-stress environment. However, it has also been estimated that the age pyramids for Neanderthals and contemporary modern humans were the same. Infant mortality was estimated to have been very high for Neanderthals, about 43% in northern Eurasia.

Anatomy

Build

Neanderthals had more robust and stockier builds than typical modern humans, wider and barrel-shaped rib cages; wider pelvises; and proportionally shorter forearms and forelegs.

Using , the body mass index for Neanderthal males was calculated to be 26.9–28.2, which in modern humans correlates to being overweight. This indicates a very robust build. The Neanderthal LEPR gene concerned with storing fat and body heat production is similar to that of the woolly mammoth, and so was likely an adaptation for cold climate.

The neck vertebrae of Neanderthals are longer and thicker than those of (most) modern humans, leading to stability, possibly due to different head shape and size. Although the Neanderthal thorax (where the ribcage is) was similar in size to modern humans, the longer and straighter ribs would have equated to a widened mid-lower thorax and stronger breathing in the lower thorax, which are indicative of a larger diaphragm and possibly greater lung capacity. The Neanderthal chest was also more pronounced (expanded front-to-back, or antero-posteriorly). The sacrum (where the pelvis connects to the spine) was more vertically inclined, and was placed lower in relation to the pelvis, causing the spine to be less curved (exhibit less lordosis) and to fold in on itself somewhat (to be invaginated). In modern populations, this condition affects just a proportion of the population, and is known as a lumbarized sacrum. Such modifications to the spine would have enhanced side-to-side (mediolateral) flexion, better supporting the wider lower thorax. It is claimed by some that this feature would be normal for all Homo, even tropically-adapted Homo ergaster or erectus, with the condition of a narrower thorax in most modern humans being a unique characteristic.

Body proportions are usually cited as being "hyperarctic" as adaptations to the cold, because they are similar to those of human populations which developed in cold climates—the Neanderthal build is most similar to that of Inuit and Siberian Yupiks among modern humans—and shorter limbs result in higher retention of body heat. Nonetheless, Neanderthals from more temperate climates—such as Iberia—still retain the "hyperarctic" physique. In 2019, English anthropologist John Stewart and colleagues suggested Neanderthals instead were adapted for sprinting, because of evidence of Neanderthals preferring more warmer wooded areas over the colder mammoth steppe, and DNA analysis indicating a higher proportion of fast-twitch muscle fibres in Neanderthals than in modern humans. He explained their body proportions and greater muscle mass as adaptations to sprinting as opposed to the endurance-oriented modern human physique, as persistence hunting may only be effective in hot climates where the hunter can run prey to the point of heat exhaustion (hyperthermia). They had longer heel bones, reducing their ability for endurance running, and their shorter limbs would have reduced moment arm at the limbs, allowing for greater net rotational force at the wrists and ankles, causing faster acceleration. In 1981, American palaeoanthropologist Erik Trinkaus made note of this alternate explanation, but considered it less likely.

Face

Neanderthals had less developed chins, sloping foreheads, and longer, broader, more projecting noses. The Neanderthal skull is typically more elongated, but also wider, and less globular than that of most modern humans, and features much more of an occipital bun, or "chignon", a protrusion on the back of the skull, although it is within the range of variation for humans who have it. It is caused by the cranial base and temporal bones being placed higher and more towards the front of the skull, and a flatter skullcap.

The Neanderthal face is characterized by mid-facial prognathism, where the zygomatic arches are positioned in a rearward location relative to modern humans, while their maxillary bones and nasal bones are positioned in a more foreward direction, by comparison. Neanderthal eyeballs are larger than those of modern humans. One study proposed that this was due to Neanderthals having enhanced visual abilities, at the expense of neocortical and social development. However this study was rejected by other researchers who concluded that eyeball size does not offer any evidence the cognitive abilities of Neanderthal or modern humans.

The projected Neanderthal nose and paranasal sinuses have generally been explained as having warmed air as it entered the lungs and retained moisture ("nasal radiator" hypothesis); if their noses were wider, it would differ to the generally narrowed shape in cold-adapted creatures, and that it would have been caused instead by genetic drift. Also, the sinuses reconstructed wide are not grossly large, being comparable in size to those of modern humans. However, if sinus size is not an important factor for breathing cold air, then the actual function would be unclear, so they may not be a good indicator of evolutionary pressures to evolve such a nose. Further, a computer reconstruction of the Neanderthal nose and predicted soft tissue patterns shows some similarities to those of modern Arctic peoples, potentially meaning the noses of both populations convergently evolved for breathing cold, dry air.

Neanderthals featured a rather large jaw which was once cited as a response to a large bite force evidenced by heavy wearing of Neanderthal front teeth (the "anterior dental loading" hypothesis), but similar wearing trends are seen in contemporary humans. It could also have evolved to fit larger teeth in the jaw, which would better resist wear and abrasion, and the increased wear on the front teeth compared to the back teeth probably stems from repetitive use. Neanderthal dental wear patterns are most similar to those of modern Inuit. The incisors are large and shovel-shaped, and, compared to modern humans, there was an unusually high frequency of taurodontism, a condition where the molars are bulkier due to an enlarged pulp (tooth core). Taurodontism was once thought to have been a distinguishing characteristic of Neanderthals which lent some mechanical advantage or stemmed from repetitive use, but was more likely simply a product of genetic drift.

Brain
The Neanderthal braincase averages 1,640 cc for males and 1,460 cc for females, which is significantly larger than the averages for all groups of extant humans; for example, modern European males average  and females . For 28 modern human specimens from 190 to 25 thousand years ago, the average was about  disregarding sex, and modern human brain size is suggested to have decreased since the Upper Palaeolithic. The largest Neanderthal brain, Amud 1, was calculated to be , one of the largest ever recorded in hominids.

When viewed from the rear, the Neanderthal braincase has lower, wider, rounder appearance than in anatomically modern humans. This characteristic shape is referred to as "en bombe" (bomb-like), and is unique to Neanderthals, with all other hominid species (including most modern humans) generally having narrow and relatively upright cranial vaults, when viewed from behind. The Neanderthal brain would have been characterized by relatively smaller parietal lobes and a larger cerebellum. Neanderthal brains also have larger occipital lobes (relating to the classic occurrence of an occipital bun in Neanderthal skull anatomy, as well as the greater width of their skulls), which implies internal differences in the proportionality of brain-internal regions, relative to Homo sapiens, consistent with external measurements obtained with fossil skulls. Their brains also have larger temporal lobe poles, wider orbitofrontal cortex, and larger olfactory bulbs, suggesting potential differences in language comprehension and associations with emotions (temporal functions), decision making (the orbitofrontal cortex), and sense of smell (olfactory bulbs). Their brains also show different rates of brain growth and development. Such differences, while slight, would have been visible to natural selection and may underlie and explain differences in the material record in things like social behaviors, technological innovation, and artistic output.

Hair and skin colour
The lack of sunlight most likely led to the proliferation of lighter skin in Neanderthals, although it has been recently claimed that light skin in modern Europeans was not particularly prolific until perhaps the Bronze Age. Genetically, BNC2 was present in Neanderthals, which is associated with light skin colour; however, a second variation of BNC2 was also present, which in modern populations is associated with darker skin colour in the UK Biobank. DNA analysis of three Neanderthal females from southeastern Europe indicates that they had brown eyes, dark skin color, and brown hair; with one having red hair.

In modern humans, skin and hair colour is regulated by the melanocyte-stimulating hormone—which increases the proportion of eumelanin (black pigment) to phaeomelanin (red pigment)—which is encoded by the MC1R gene. There are five known variants in modern humans of the gene which cause loss-of-function and are associated with light skin and hair colour, and another unknown variant in Neanderthals (the R307G variant) which could be associated with pale skin and red hair. The R307G variant was identified in a Neanderthal from Monti Lessini, Italy, and possibly Cueva del Sidrón, Spain. However, as in modern humans, red was probably not a very common hair colour because the variant is not present in many other sequenced Neanderthals.

Metabolism

Maximum natural lifespan and the timing of adulthood, menopause, and gestation were most likely very similar to modern humans. However, it has been hypothesised, based on the growth rates of teeth and tooth enamel, that Neanderthals matured faster than modern humans although this is not backed up by age biomarkers. The main differences in maturation are the atlas bone in the neck as well as the middle thoracic vertebrae fused about 2 years later in Neanderthals than in modern humans, but this was more likely caused by a difference in anatomy rather than growth rate.

Generally, models on Neanderthal caloric requirements report significantly higher intakes than those of modern humans because they typically assume Neanderthals had higher basal metabolic rates (BMRs) due to higher muscle mass, faster growth rate, and greater body heat production against the cold; and higher daily physical activity levels (PALs) due to greater daily travelling distances while foraging. However, using a high BMR and PAL, American archaeologist Bryan Hockett estimated that a pregnant Neanderthal would have consumed 5,500 calories per day, which would have necessitated a heavy reliance on big game meat; such a diet would have caused numerous deficiencies or nutrient poisonings, so he concluded that these are poorly warranted assumptions to make.

Neanderthals may have been more active during dimmer light conditions rather than broad daylight because they lived in regions with reduced daytime hours, hunted large game (such predators typically hunt at night to enhance ambush tactics), and had large eyes and visual processing neural centres. Genetically, colour blindness (which may enhance mesopic vision) is typically correlated with northern-latitude populations, and the Neanderthals from Vindija Cave, Croatia, had some substitutions in the Opsin genes which could have influenced colour vision. However, the functional implications of these substitutions are inconclusive. Neanderthal-derived alleles near ASB1 and EXOC6 are associated with being an evening person, narcolepsy, and day-time napping.

Pathology
Neanderthals suffered a high rate of traumatic injury, with an estimated 79–94% of specimens showing evidence of healed major trauma, of which 37–52% were severely injured, and 13–19% injured before reaching adulthood. One extreme example is Shanidar 1, who shows signs of an amputation of the right arm likely due to a nonunion after breaking a bone in adolescence, osteomyelitis (a bone infection) on the left clavicle, an abnormal gait, vision problems in the left eye, and possible hearing loss (perhaps swimmer's ear). In 1995, Trinkaus estimated that about 80% succumbed to their injuries and died before reaching 40, and thus theorised that Neanderthals employed a risky hunting strategy ("rodeo rider" hypothesis). However, rates of cranial trauma are not significantly different between Neanderthals and Middle Palaeolithic modern humans (although Neanderthals seem to have had a higher mortality risk), there are few specimens of both Upper Palaeolithic modern humans and Neanderthals who died after the age of 40, and there are overall similar injury patterns between them. In 2012, Trinkaus concluded that Neanderthals instead injured themselves in the same way as contemporary humans, such as by interpersonal violence. A 2016 study looking at 124 Neanderthal specimens argued that high trauma rates were instead caused by animal attacks, and found that about 36% of the sample were victims of bear attacks, 21% big cat attacks, and 17% wolf attacks (totalling 92 positive cases, 74%). There were no cases of hyaena attacks, although hyaenas still nonetheless probably attacked Neanderthals, at least opportunistically. Such intense predation probably stemmed from common confrontations due to competition over food and cave space, and from Neanderthals hunting these carnivores.

Low population caused a low genetic diversity and probably inbreeding, which reduced the population's ability to filter out harmful mutations (inbreeding depression). However, it is unknown how this affected a single Neanderthal's genetic burden and, thus, if this caused a higher rate of birth defects than in modern humans. It is known, however, that the 13 inhabitants of Sidrón Cave collectively exhibited 17 different birth defects likely due to inbreeding or recessive disorders. Likely due to advanced age (60s or 70s), La Chapelle-aux-Saints 1 had signs of Baastrup's disease, affecting the spine, and osteoarthritis. Shanidar 1, who likely died at about 30 or 40, was diagnosed with the most ancient case of diffuse idiopathic skeletal hyperostosis (DISH), a degenerative disease which can restrict movement, which, if correct, would indicate a moderately high incident rate for older Neanderthals.

Neanderthals were subject to several infectious diseases and parasites. Modern humans likely transmitted diseases to them; one possible candidate is the stomach bacteria Helicobacter pylori. The modern human papillomavirus variant 16A may descend from Neanderthal introgression. A Neanderthal at Cueva del Sidrón, Spain, shows evidence of a gastrointestinal Enterocytozoon bieneusi infection. The leg bones of the French La Ferrassie 1 feature lesions that are consistent with periostitis—inflammation of the tissue enveloping the bone—likely a result of hypertrophic osteoarthropathy, which is primarily caused by a chest infection or lung cancer. Neanderthals had a lower cavity rate than modern humans, despite some populations consuming typically cavity-causing foods in great quantity, which could indicate a lack of cavity-causing oral bacteria, namely Streptococcus mutans.

Two 250,000-year-old Neanderthaloid children from Payré, France, present the earliest known cases of lead exposure of any hominin. They were exposed on two distinct occasions either by eating or drinking contaminated food or water, or inhaling lead-laced smoke from a fire. There are two lead mines within  of the site.

Culture

Social structure

Group dynamics

Neanderthals likely lived in more sparsely distributed groups than contemporary modern humans, but group size is thought to have averaged 10 to 30 individuals, similar to modern hunter-gatherers. Reliable evidence of Neanderthal group composition comes from Cueva del Sidrón, Spain, and the footprints at Le Rozel, France: the former shows 7 adults, 3 adolescents, 2 juveniles, and an infant; whereas the latter, based on footprint size, shows a group of 10 to 13 members where juveniles and adolescents made up 90%.

A Neanderthal child's teeth analysed in 2018 showed it was weaned after 2.5 years, similar to modern hunter gatherers, and was born in the spring, which is consistent with modern humans and other mammals whose birth cycles coincide with environmental cycles. Indicated from various ailments resulting from high stress at a low age, such as stunted growth, British archaeologist Paul Pettitt hypothesised that children of both sexes were put to work directly after weaning; and Trinkaus said that, upon reaching adolescence, an individual may have been expected to join in hunting large and dangerous game. However, the bone trauma is comparable to modern Inuit, which could suggest a similar childhood between Neanderthals and contemporary modern humans. Further, such stunting may have also resulted from harsh winters and bouts of low food resources.

Sites showing evidence of no more than three individuals may have represented nuclear families or temporary camping sites for special task groups (such as a hunting party). Bands likely moved between certain caves depending on the season, indicated by remains of seasonal materials such as certain foods, and returned to the same locations generation after generation. Some sites may have been used for over 100 years. Cave bears may have greatly competed with Neanderthals for cave space, and there is a decline in cave bear populations starting 50,000 years ago onwards (although their extinction occurred well after Neanderthals had died out). Although Neanderthals are generally considered to have been cave dwellers, with 'home base' being a cave, open-air settlements near contemporaneously inhabited cave systems in the Levant could indicate mobility between cave and open-air bases in this area. Evidence for long-term open-air settlements is known from the 'Ein Qashish site in Israel, and Moldova I in Ukraine. Although Neanderthals appear to have had the ability to inhabit a range of environments—including plains and plateaux—open-air Neanderthals sites are generally interpreted as having been used as slaughtering and butchering grounds rather than living spaces.

In 2022, remains of the first-known Neanderthal family (six adults and five children) were excavated from Chagyrskaya Cave in the Altai Mountains of southern Siberia in Russia. The family, which included a father, a daughter, and what appear to be cousins, most likely died together, presumably from starvation.

Inter-group relations
Canadian ethnoarchaeologist Brian Hayden calculated a self-sustaining population that avoids inbreeding to consist of about 450–500 individuals, which would necessitate these bands to interact with 8–53 other bands, but more likely the larger estimate given low population density. Analysis of the mtDNA of the Neanderthals of Cueva del Sidrón, Spain, showed that the three adult men belonged to the same maternal lineage, while the three adult women belonged to different ones. This suggests a patrilocal residence (that a woman moved out of her group to live with her husband).

However, a few Neanderthal artefacts in a settlement could have originated 20, 30, 100, and 300 km (12.5, 18.5, 60, and 185 mi) away. Based on this, Hayden also speculated that macro-bands formed which functioned much like those of the low-density hunter-gatherer societies of the Western Desert of Australia. Macro-bands collectively encompass , with each band claiming , maintaining strong alliances for mating networks or to cope with leaner times and enemies. However, according to their model Neanderthals would not have been as efficient at maintaining long-distance networks as modern humans, probably due to a significantly lower population. Hayden noted an apparent cemetery of six or seven individuals at La Ferrassie, France, which, in modern humans, is typically used as evidence of a corporate group which maintained a distinct social identity and controlled some resource, trading, manufacturing, and so on. La Ferrassie is also located in one of the richest animal-migration routes of Pleistocene Europe.

Genetic analysis indicates there were at least 3 distinct geographical groups—Western Europe, the Mediterranean coast, and east of the Caucasus—with some migration among these regions. Post-Eemian Western European Mousterian lithics can also be broadly grouped into 3 distinct macro-regions: Acheulean-tradition Mousterian in the southwest, Micoquien in the northeast, and Mousterian with bifacial tools (MBT) in between the former two. MBT may actually represent the interactions and fusion of the two different cultures. Southern Neanderthals exhibit regional anatomical differences from northern counterparts: a less protrusive jaw, a shorter gap behind the molars, and a vertically higher jawbone. These all instead suggest Neanderthal communities regularly interacted with neighbouring communities within a region, but not as often beyond.

Nonetheless, over long periods of time, there is evidence of large-scale cross-continental migration. Early specimens from Mezmaiskaya Cave in the Caucasus and Denisova Cave in the Siberian Altai Mountains differ genetically from those found in Western Europe, whereas later specimens from these caves both have genetic profiles more similar to Western European Neanderthal specimens than to the earlier specimens from the same locations, suggesting long-range migration and population replacement over time. Neanderthals seem to have suffered a major population decline during MIS 4 (71–57 thousand years ago), and the distribution of the Micoquian tradition could indicate that Central Europe and the Caucasus were repopulated by communities from a refuge zone either in eastern France or Hungary (the fringes of the Micoquian tradition) who dispersed along the rivers Prut and Dniester.

There is also evidence of inter-group conflict: a skeleton from La Roche à Pierrot, France, showing a healed fracture on top of the skull apparently caused by a deep blade wound, and another from Shanidar Cave, Iraq, found to have a rib lesion characteristic of projectile weapon injuries.

Social hierarchy
It is sometimes suggested, since they were hunters of challenging big game and lived in small groups, there was no sexual division of labour as seen in modern hunter-gatherer societies. That is, men, women, and children all had to be involved in hunting, instead of men hunting with women and children foraging. However, with modern hunter-gatherers, the higher the meat dependency, the higher the division of labour. Further, tooth-wearing patterns in Neanderthal men and women suggest they commonly used their teeth for carrying items, but men exhibit more wearing on the upper teeth, and women the lower, suggesting some cultural differences in tasks.

It is controversially proposed that some Neanderthals wore decorative clothing or jewellery—such as a leopard skin or raptor feathers—to display elevated status in the group. Hayden postulated that the small number of Neanderthal graves found was because only high-ranking members would receive an elaborate burial, as is the case for some modern hunter-gatherers. Trinkaus suggested that elderly Neanderthals were given special burial rites for lasting so long given the high mortality rates. Alternatively, many more Neanderthals may have received burials, but the graves were infiltrated and destroyed by bears. Given that 20 graves of Neanderthals aged under 4 have been found—over a third of all known graves—deceased children may have received greater care during burial than other age demographics.

Looking at Neanderthal skeletons recovered from several natural rock shelters, Trinkaus said that, although Neanderthals were recorded as bearing several trauma-related injuries, none of them had significant trauma to the legs that would debilitate movement. He suggested that self worth in Neanderthal culture derived from contributing food to the group; a debilitating injury would remove this self-worth and result in near-immediate death, and individuals who could not keep up with the group while moving from cave to cave were left behind. However, there are examples of individuals with highly debilitating injuries being nursed for several years, and caring for the most vulnerable within the community dates even further back to H. heidelbergensis. Especially given the high trauma rates, it is possible that such an altruistic strategy ensured their survival as a species for so long.

Food

Hunting and gathering

Neanderthals were once thought of as scavengers, but are now considered to have been apex predators. In 1980, it was hypothesised that two piles of mammoth skulls at La Cotte de St Brelade, Jersey, at the base of a gulley were evidence of mammoth drive hunting (causing them to stampede off a ledge), but this is contested. Living in a forested environment, Neanderthals were likely ambush hunters, getting close to and attacking their target—a prime adult—in a short burst of speed, thrusting in a spear at close quarters. Younger or wounded animals may have been hunted using traps, projectiles, or pursuit. Nonetheless, they were able to adapt to a variety of habitats. They appear to have eaten predominantly what was abundant within their immediate surroundings, with steppe-dwelling communities (generally outside of the Mediterranean) subsisting almost entirely on meat from large game, forest-dwelling communities consuming a wide array of plants and smaller animals, and waterside communities gathering aquatic resources. Contemporary humans, in contrast, seem to have used more complex food extraction strategies and generally had a more diverse diet. Nonetheless, Neanderthals still would have had to have eaten a varied enough diet to prevent nutrient deficiencies and protein poisoning, especially in the winter when they presumably ate mostly lean meat. Any food with high contents of other essential nutrients not provided by lean meat would have been vital components of their diet, such as fat-rich brains, carbohydrate-rich and abundant underground storage organs (including roots and tubers), or, like modern Inuit, the stomach contents of herbivorous prey items.

For meat, they appear to have fed predominantly on hoofed mammals, namely red deer and reindeer as these two were the most abundant game, but also on other Pleistocene megafauna such as ibex, wild boar, aurochs, mammoth, straight-tusked elephant, woolly rhinoceros, and so on. There is evidence of directed cave and brown bear hunting both in and out of hibernation, as well as butchering. Analysis of Neanderthal bone collagen from Vindija Cave, Croatia, shows nearly all of their protein needs derived from animal meat. Some caves show evidence of regular rabbit and tortoise consumption. At Gibraltar sites, there are remains of 143 different bird species, many ground-dwelling such as the common quail, corn crake, woodlark, and crested lark. Neanderthals also exploited marine resources on the Iberian, Italian, and Peloponnesian Peninsulas, where they waded or dived for shellfish, as early as 150,000 years ago at Cueva Bajondillo, Spain, similar to the fishing record of modern humans. At Vanguard Cave, Gibraltar, the inhabitants consumed Mediterranean monk seal, short-beaked common dolphin, common bottlenose dolphin, Atlantic bluefin tuna, sea bream, and purple sea urchin; and at Gruta da Figueira Brava, Portugal, there is evidence of large-scale harvest of shellfish, crabs, and fish. Evidence of freshwater fishing was found in Grotte di Castelcivita, Italy, for trout, chub, and eel; Abri du Maras, France, for chub and European perch; Payré, France; and Kudaro Cave, Russia, for Black Sea salmon.

Edible plant and mushroom remains are recorded from several caves. Neanderthals from Cueva del Sidrón, Spain, based on dental tartar, likely had a meatless diet of mushrooms, pine nuts, and moss, indicating they were forest foragers. Remnants from Amud Cave, Israel, indicates a diet of figs, palm tree fruits, and various cereals and edible grasses. Several bone traumas in the leg joints could possibly suggest habitual squatting, which, if the case, was likely done while gathering food. Dental tartar from Grotte de Spy, Belgium, indicates the inhabitants had a meat-heavy diet including woolly rhinoceros and mouflon sheep, while also regularly consuming mushrooms. Neanderthal faecal matter from El Salt, Spain, dated to 50,000 years ago—the oldest human faecal matter remains recorded—show a diet mainly of meat but with a significant component of plants. Evidence of cooked plant foods—mainly legumes and, to a far lesser extent, acorns—was discovered in Kebara Cave, Israel, with its inhabitants possibly gathering plants in spring and fall and hunting in all seasons except fall, although the cave was probably abandoned in late summer to early fall. At Shanidar Cave, Iraq, Neanderthals collected plants with various harvest seasons, indicating they scheduled returns to the area to harvest certain plants, and that they had complex food-gathering behaviours for both meat and plants.

Food preparation
Neanderthals probably could employ a wide range of cooking techniques, such as roasting, and they may have been able to heat up or boil soup, stew, or animal stock. The abundance of animal bone fragments at settlements may indicate the making of fat stocks from boiling bone marrow, possibly taken from animals that had already died of starvation. These methods would have substantially increased fat consumption, which was a major nutritional requirement of communities with low carbohydrate and high protein intake. Neanderthal tooth size had a decreasing trend after 100,000 years ago, which could indicate an increased dependence on cooking or the advent of boiling, a technique that would have softened food.

At Cueva del Sidrón, Spain, Neanderthals likely cooked and possibly smoked food, as well as used certain plants—such as yarrow and camomile—as flavouring, although these plants may have instead been used for their medicinal properties. At Gorham's Cave, Gibraltar, Neanderthals may have been roasting pinecones to access pine nuts.

At Grotte du Lazaret, France, a total of 23 red deer, 6 ibexes, 3 aurochs, and 1 roe deer appear to have been hunted in a single autumn hunting season, when strong male and female deer herds would group together for rut. The entire carcasses seem to have been transported to the cave and then butchered. Because this is such a large amount of food to consume before spoilage, it is possible these Neanderthals were curing and preserving it before winter set in. At 160,000 years old, it is the oldest potential evidence of food storage. The great quantities of meat and fat which could have been gathered in general from typical prey items (namely mammoths) could also indicate food storage capability. With shellfish, Neanderthals needed to eat, cook, or in some manner preserve them soon after collection, as shellfish spoils very quickly. At Cueva de los Aviones, Spain, the remains of edible, algae eating shellfish associated with the alga Jania rubens could indicate that, like some modern hunter gatherer societies, harvested shellfish were held in water-soaked algae to keep them alive and fresh until consumption.

Competition

Competition from large Ice Age predators was rather high. Cave lions likely targeted horses, large deer and wild cattle; and leopards primarily reindeer and roe deer; which heavily overlapped with Neanderthal diet. To defend a kill against such ferocious predators, Neanderthals may have engaged in a group display of yelling, arm waving, or stone throwing; or quickly gathered meat and abandoned the kill. However, at Grotte de Spy, Belgium, the remains of wolves, cave lions, and cave bears—which were all major predators of the time—indicate Neanderthals hunted their competitors to some extent.

Neanderthals and cave hyaenas may have exemplified niche differentiation, and actively avoided competing with each other. Although they both mainly targeted the same groups of creatures—deer, horses, and cattle—Neanderthals mainly hunted the former and cave hyaenas the latter two. Further, animal remains from Neanderthal caves indicate they preferred to hunt prime individuals, whereas cave hyaenas hunted weaker or younger prey, and cave hyaena caves have a higher abundance of carnivore remains. Nonetheless, there is evidence that cave hyaenas stole food and leftovers from Neanderthal campsites and scavenged on dead Neanderthal bodies.

Cannibalism
There are several instances of Neanderthals practising cannibalism across their range. The first example came from Krapina, Croatia, in 1899, and other examples were found at Cueva del Sidrón and Zafarraya in Spain; and the French Grotte de Moula-Guercy, Les Pradelles, and La Quina. For the five cannibalised Neanderthals at the Grottes de Goyet, Belgium, there is evidence that the upper limbs were disarticulated, the lower limbs defleshed and also smashed (likely to extract bone marrow), the chest cavity disemboweled, and the jaw dismembered. There is also evidence that the butchers used some bones to retouch their tools. The processing of Neanderthal meat at Grottes de Goyet is similar to how they processed horse and reindeer. About 35% of the Neanderthals at Marillac-le-Franc, France, show clear signs of butchery, and the presence of digested teeth indicates that the bodies were abandoned and eaten by scavengers, likely hyaenas.

These cannibalistic tendencies have been explained as either ritual defleshing, pre-burial defleshing (to prevent scavengers or foul smell), an act of war, or simply for food. Due to a small number of cases, and the higher number of cut marks seen on cannibalised individuals than animals (indicating inexperience), cannibalism was probably not a very common practice, and it may have only been done in times of extreme food shortages as in some cases in recorded human history.

The arts

Personal adornment
Neanderthals used ochre, a clay earth pigment. Ochre is well-documented from 60 to 45 thousand years ago in Neanderthal sites, with the earliest example dating to 250–200 thousand years ago from Maastricht-Belvédère, the Netherlands (a similar timespan to the ochre record of H. sapiens). It has been hypothesised to have functioned as body paint, and analyses of pigments from Pech de l’Azé, France, indicates they were applied to soft materials (such as a hide or human skin). However, modern hunter gatherers, in addition to body paint, also use ochre for medicine, for tanning hides, as a food preservative, and as an insect repellent, so its use as decorative paint for Neanderthals is speculative. Containers apparently used for mixing ochre pigments were found in Peștera Cioarei, Romania, which could indicate modification of ochre for solely aesthetic purposes.

The discoverers of the latter two claim that pigment was applied to the exterior to make it match the naturally vibrant inside colouration. Excavated from 1949 to 1963 from the French Grotte du Renne, Châtelperronian beads made from animal teeth, shells, and ivory were found associated with Neanderthal bones, but the dating is uncertain and Châtelperronian artefacts may actually have been crafted by modern humans and simply redeposited with Neanderthal remains.

Gibraltarian palaeoanthropologists Clive and Geraldine Finlayson suggested that Neanderthals used various bird parts as artistic mediums, specifically black feathers. In 2012, the Finlaysons and colleagues examined 1,699 sites across Eurasia, and argued that raptors and corvids, species not typically consumed by any human species, were overrepresented and show processing of only the wing bones instead of the fleshier torso, and thus are evidence of feather plucking of specifically the large flight feathers for use as personal adornment. They specifically noted the cinereous vulture, red-billed chough, kestrel, lesser kestrel, alpine chough, rook, jackdaw, and the white tailed eagle in Middle Palaeolithic sites. Other birds claimed to present evidence of modifications by Neanderthals are the golden eagle, rock pigeon, common raven, and the bearded vulture. The earliest claim of bird bone jewellery is a number of 130,000 year old white tailed eagle talons found in a cache near Krapina, Croatia, speculated, in 2015, to have been a necklace. A similar 39,000-year-old Spanish imperial eagle talon necklace was reported in 2019 at Cova Foradà in Spain, though from the contentious Châtelperronian layer. In 2017, 17 incision-decorated raven bones from the Zaskalnaya VI rock shelter, Ukraine, dated to 43–38 thousand years ago were reported. Because the notches are more-or-less equidistant to each other, they are the first modified bird bones that cannot be explained by simple butchery, and for which the argument of design intent is based on direct evidence.

Discovered in 1975, the so-called Mask of la Roche-Cotard, a mostly flat piece of flint with a bone pushed through a hole on the midsection—dated to 32, 40, or 75 thousand years ago—has been purported to resemble the upper half of a face, with the bone representing eyes. It is contested whether it represents a face, or if it even counts as art. In 1988, American archaeologist Alexander Marshack speculated that a Neanderthal at Grotte de L'Hortus, France, wore a leopard pelt as personal adornment to indicate elevated status in the group based on a recovered leopard skull, phalanges, and tail vertebrae.

Abstraction

As of 2014, 63 purported engravings have been reported from 27 different European and Middle Eastern Lower-to-Middle Palaeolithic sites, of which 20 are on flint cortexes from 11 sites, 7 are on slabs from 7 sites, and 36 are on pebbles from 13 sites. It is debated whether or not these were made with symbolic intent. In 2012, deep scratches on the floor of Gorham's Cave, Gibraltar, were discovered, dated to older than 39,000 years ago, which the discoverers have interpreted as Neanderthal abstract art. The scratches could have also been produced by a bear. In 2021, an Irish elk phalanx with five engraved offset chevrons stacked above each other was discovered at the entrance to the Einhornhöhle cave in Germany, dating to about 51,000 years ago.

In 2018, some red-painted dots, disks, lines, and hand stencils on the cave walls of the Spanish La Pasiega, Maltravieso, and Doña Trinidad were dated to be older than 66,000 years ago, at least 20,000 years prior to the arrival of modern humans in Western Europe. This would indicate Neanderthal authorship, and similar iconography recorded in other Western European sites—such as Les Merveilles, France, and Cueva del Castillo, Spain—could potentially also have Neanderthal origins. However, the dating of these Spanish caves, and thus attribution to Neanderthals, is contested.

Neanderthals are known to have collected a variety of unusual objects—such as crystals or fossils—without any real functional purpose or any indication of damage caused by use. It is unclear if these objects were simply picked up for their aesthetic qualities, or if some symbolic significance was applied to them. These items are mainly quartz crystals, but also other minerals such as cerussite, iron pyrite, calcite, and galena. A few findings feature modifications, such as a mammoth tooth with an incision and a fossil nummulite shell with a cross etched in from Tata, Hungary; a large slab with 18 cupstones hollowed out from a grave in La Ferrassie, France; and a geode from Peștera Cioarei, Romania, coated with red ochre. A number of fossil shells are also known from French Neanderthals sites, such as a rhynchonellid and a Taraebratulina from Combe Grenal; a belemnite beak from Grottes des Canalettes; a polyp from Grotte de l'Hyène; a sea urchin from La Gonterie-Boulouneix; and a rhynchonella, feather star, and belemnite beak from the contentious Châtelperronian layer of Grotte du Renne.

Music

Purported Neanderthal bone flute fragments made of bear long bones were reported from Potočka zijalka, Slovenia, in the 1920s, and Istállós-kői-barlang, Hungary, and Mokriška jama, Slovenia, in 1985; but these are now attributed to modern human activities. The 1995 43 thousand year old Divje Babe Flute from Slovenia has been attributed by some researchers to Neanderthals, and Canadian musicologist Robert Fink said the original flute had either a diatonic or pentatonic musical scale. However, the date also overlaps with modern human immigration into Europe, which means it is also possible it was not manufactured by Neanderthals. In 2015, zoologist Cajus Diedrich argued that it was not a flute at all, and the holes were made by a scavenging hyaena as there is a lack of cut marks stemming from whittling, but in 2018, Slovenian archaeologist Matija Turk and colleagues countered that it is highly unlikely the punctures were made by teeth, and cut marks are not always present on bone flutes.

Technology
Despite the apparent 150 thousand year stagnation in Neanderthal lithic innovation, there is evidence that Neanderthal technology was more sophisticated than was previously thought. However, the high frequency of potentially debilitating injuries could have prevented very complex technologies from emerging, as a major injury would have impeded an expert's ability to effectively teach a novice.

Stone tools

Neanderthals made stone tools, and are associated with the Mousterian industry. The Mousterian is also associated with North African H. sapiens as early as 315,000 years ago and was found in Northern China about 47–37 thousand years ago. It evolved around 300,000 years ago with the Levallois technique which developed directly from the preceding Acheulean industry (invented by H. erectus about 1.8 mya). Levallois made it easier to control flake shape and size, and as a difficult-to-learn and unintuitive process, the Levallois technique may have been directly taught generation to generation rather than via purely observational learning.

There are distinct regional variants of the Mousterian industry, such as: the Quina and La Ferrassie subtypes of the Charentian industry in southwestern France, Acheulean-tradition Mousterian subtypes A and B along the Atlantic and northwestern European coasts, the Micoquien industry of Central and Eastern Europe and the related Sibiryachikha variant in the Siberian Altai Mountains, the Denticulate Mousterian industry in Western Europe, the racloir industry around the Zagros Mountains, and the flake cleaver industry of Cantabria, Spain, and both sides of the Pyrenees. In the mid-20th century, French archaeologist François Bordes debated against American archaeologist Lewis Binford to explain this diversity (the "Bordes–Binford debate"), with Bordes arguing that these represent unique ethnic traditions and Binford that they were caused by varying environments (essentially, form vs. function). The latter sentiment would indicate a lower degree of inventiveness compared to modern humans, adapting the same tools to different environments rather than creating new technologies. A continuous sequence of occupation is well-documented in Grotte du Renne, France, where the lithic tradition can be divided into the Levallois–Charentian, Discoid–Denticulate (43.3±0.929–40.9±0.719 thousand years ago), Levallois Mousterian (40.2±1.5–38.4±1.3 thousand years ago), and Châtelperronian (40.93±0.393–33.67±0.450 thousand years ago).

There is some debate if Neanderthals had long-ranged weapons. A wound on the neck of an African wild ass from Umm el Tlel, Syria, was likely inflicted by a heavy Levallois-point javelin, and bone trauma consistent with habitual throwing has been reported in Neanderthals. Some spear tips from Abri du Maras, France, may have been too fragile to have been used as thrusting spears, possibly suggesting their use as darts.

Organic tools
The Châtelperronian in central France and northern Spain is a distinct industry from the Mousterian, and is controversially hypothesised to represent a culture of Neanderthals borrowing (or by process of acculturation) tool-making techniques from immigrating modern humans, crafting bone tools and ornaments. In this frame, the makers would have been a transitional culture between the Neanderthal Mousterian and the modern human Aurignacian. The opposing viewpoint is that the Châtelperronian was manufactured by modern humans instead. Abrupt transitions similar to the Mousterian/Châtelperronian could also simply represent natural innovation, like the La Quina–Neronian transition 50,000 years ago featuring technologies generally associated with modern humans such as bladelets and microliths. Other ambiguous transitional cultures include the Italian Uluzzian industry, and the Balkan Szeletian industry.

Before immigration, the only evidence of Neanderthal bone tools are animal rib lissoirs — which are rubbed against hide to make it more supple or waterproof — although this could also be evidence for modern humans immigrating earlier than expected. In 2013, two 51.4–41.1 thousand year old deer rib lissoirs were reported from Pech-de-l’Azé and the nearby Abri Peyrony in France. In 2020, 5 more lissoirs made of aurochs or bison ribs were reported from Abri Peyrony, with one dating to about 51,400 years ago and the other four to 47.7–41.1 thousand years ago. This indicates the technology was in use in this region for a long time. Since reindeer remains were the most abundant, the use of less abundant bovine ribs may indicate a specific preference for bovine ribs. Potential lissoirs have also been reported from Grosse Grotte, Germany (made of mammoth), and Grottes des Canalettes, France (red deer).

The Neanderthals in 10 coastal sites in Italy (namely Grotta del Cavallo and Grotta dei Moscerini) and Kalamakia Cave, Greece, are known to have crafted scrapers using smooth clam shells, and possibly hafted them to a wooden handle. They probably chose this clam species because it has the most durable shell. At Grotta dei Moscerini, about 24% of the shells were gathered alive from the seafloor, meaning these Neanderthals had to wade or dive into shallow waters to collect them. At Grotta di Santa Lucia, Italy, in the Campanian volcanic arc, Neanderthals collected the porous volcanic pumice, which, for contemporary humans, was probably used for polishing points and needles. The pumices are associated with shell tools.

At Abri du Maras, France, twisted fibres and a 3-ply inner-bark-fibre cord fragment associated with Neanderthals show that they produced string and cordage, but it is unclear how widespread this technology was because the materials used to make them (such as animal hair, hide, sinew, or plant fibres) are biodegradable and preserve very poorly. This technology could indicate at least a basic knowledge of weaving and knotting, which would have made possible the production of nets, containers, packaging, baskets, carrying devices, ties, straps, harnesses, clothes, shoes, beds, bedding, mats, flooring, roofing, walls, and snares, and would have been important in hafting, fishing, and seafaring. Dating to 52–41 thousand years ago, the cord fragment is the oldest direct evidence of fibre technology, although 115,000-year-old perforated shell beads from Cueva Antón possibly strung together to make a necklace are the oldest indirect evidence. In 2020, British archaeologist Rebecca Wragg Sykes expressed cautious support for the genuineness of the find, but pointed out that the string would have been so weak that it would have had limited functions. One possibility is as a thread for attaching or stringing small objects.

The archaeological record shows that Neanderthals commonly used animal hide and birch bark, and may have used them to make cooking containers, although this is based largely on circumstantial evidence, because neither fossilizes well. It is possible that the Neanderthals at Kebara Cave, Israel, used the shells of the spur-thighed tortoise as containers.

At the Italian Poggetti Vecchi site, there is evidence that they used fire to process boxwood branches to make digging sticks, a common implement in hunter-gatherer societies.

Fire and construction
Many Mousterian sites have evidence of fire, some for extended periods of time, though it is unclear whether they were capable of starting fire or simply scavenged from naturally occurring wildfires. Indirect evidence of fire-starting ability includes pyrite residue on a couple of dozen bifaces from late Mousterian (c. 50,000 years ago) northwestern France (which could indicate they were used as percussion fire starters), and collection of manganese dioxide by late Neanderthals which can lower the combustion temperature of wood. They were also capable of zoning areas for specific activities, such as for knapping, butchering, hearths, and wood storage. Many Neanderthal sites lack evidence for such activity perhaps due to natural degradation of the area over tens of thousands of years, such as by bear infiltration after abandonment of the settlement.

In a number of caves, evidence of hearths has been detected. Neanderthals likely considered air circulation when making hearths as a lack of proper ventilation for a single hearth can render a cave uninhabitable in several minutes. Abric Romaní rock shelter, Spain, indicates eight evenly spaced hearths lined up against the rock wall, likely used to stay warm while sleeping, with one person sleeping on either side of the fire. At Cueva de Bolomor, Spain, with hearths lined up against the wall, the smoke flowed upwards to the ceiling, and led to outside the cave. In Grotte du Lazaret, France, smoke was probably naturally ventilated during the winter as the interior cave temperature was greater than the outside temperature; likewise, the cave was likely only inhabited in the winter.

Evidence of the use of fire and burnt bones also suggest human activity. A team of Neanderthals was likely necessary to construct the structure, but the chamber's actual purpose is uncertain. Building complex structures so deep in a cave is unprecedented in the archaeological record, and indicates sophisticated lighting and construction technology, and great familiarity with subterranean environments.

The 44,000 year old Moldova I open-air site, Ukraine, shows evidence of a  ring-shaped dwelling made out of mammoth bones meant for long-term habitation by several Neanderthals, which would have taken a long time to build. It appears to have contained hearths, cooking areas, and a flint workshop, and there are traces of woodworking. Upper Palaeolithic modern humans in the Russian plains are thought to have also made housing structures out of mammoth bones.

Bark tar
Neanderthal produced the adhesive birch bark tar, perhaps using plant-based resins for hafting. It was long believed that birch bark tar required a complex recipe to be followed, and that it thus showed complex cognitive skills and cultural transmission. However, a 2019 study showed it can be made simply by burning birch bark on smooth vertical surfaces, such as a flat, inclined rock.

Clothes
Neanderthals were likely able to survive in a similar range of temperatures to modern humans while sleeping: about  while naked in the open and windspeed , or  while naked in an enclosed space. Especially during extended periods of travelling (such as a hunting trip), tailored footwear completely enwrapping the feet may have been necessary.

Nonetheless, as opposed to the bone sewing-needles and stitching awls assumed to have been in use by contemporary modern humans, the only known Neanderthal tools that could have been used to fashion clothes are hide scrapers, which could have made items similar to blankets or ponchos, and there is no direct evidence they could produce fitted clothes. Indirect evidence of tailoring by Neanderthals includes the ability to manufacture string, which could indicate weaving ability, and a naturally-pointed horse metatarsal bone from Cueva de los Aviones, Spain, which was speculated to have been used as an awl, perforating dyed hides, based on the presence of orange pigments. Whatever the case, Neanderthals would have needed to cover up most of their body, and contemporary humans would have covered 80–90%.

Since human/Neanderthal admixture is known to have occurred in the Middle East, and no modern body louse species descends from their Neanderthal counterparts (body lice only inhabit clothed individuals), it is possible Neanderthals (and/or humans) in hotter climates did not wear clothes, or Neanderthal lice were highly specialised.

Seafaring
Remains of Middle Palaeolithic stone tools on Greek islands indicate early seafaring by Neanderthals in the Ionian Sea possibly starting as far back as 200–150 thousand years ago. The oldest stone artefacts from Crete date to 130–107 thousand years ago, Cephalonia 125 thousand years ago, and Zakynthos 110–35 thousand years ago. The makers of these artefacts likely employed simple reed boats and made one-day crossings back and forth. Other Mediterranean islands with such remains include Sardinia, Melos, Alonnisos, and Naxos (although Naxos may have been connected to land), and it is possible they crossed the Strait of Gibraltar. If this interpretation is correct, Neanderthals' ability to engineer boats and navigate through open waters would speak to their advanced cognitive and technical skills.

Medicine
Given their dangerous hunting and extensive skeletal evidence of healing, Neanderthals appear to have lived lives of frequent traumatic injury and recovery. Well-healed fractures on many bones indicate the setting of splints. Individuals with severe head and rib traumas (which would have caused massive blood loss) indicate they had some manner of dressing major wounds, such as bandages made from animal skin. By-and-large, they appear to have avoided severe infections, indicating good long-term treatment of such wounds.

Their knowledge of medicinal plants was comparable to that of contemporary humans. An individual at Cueva del Sidrón, Spain, seems to have been medicating a dental abscess using poplar—which contains salicylic acid, the active ingredient in aspirin—and there were also traces of the antibiotic-producing Penicillium chrysogenum. They may also have used yarrow and camomile, and their bitter taste—which should act as a deterrent as it could indicate poison—means it was likely a deliberate act. In Kebara Cave, Israel, plant remains which have historically been used for their medicinal properties were found, including the common grape vine, the pistachios of the Persian turpentine tree, ervil seeds, and oak acorns.

Language

The degree of language complexity is difficult to establish, but given that Neanderthals achieved some technical and cultural complexity, and interbred with humans, it is reasonable to assume they were at least fairly articulate, comparable to modern humans. A somewhat complex language—possibly using syntax—was likely necessary to survive in their harsh environment, with Neanderthals needing to communicate about topics such as locations, hunting and gathering, and tool-making techniques. The FOXP2 gene in modern humans is associated with speech and language development. FOXP2 was present in Neanderthals, but not the gene's modern human variant. Neurologically, Neanderthals had an expanded Broca's area—operating the formulation of sentences, and speech comprehension, but out of a group 48 genes believed to affect the neural substrate of language, 11 had different methylation patterns between Neanderthals and modern humans. This could indicate a stronger ability in modern humans than in Neanderthals to express language.

In 1971, cognitive scientist Philip Lieberman attempted to reconstruct the Neanderthal vocal tract and concluded that it was similar to that of a newborn and incapable of producing a large range of speech sounds, due to the large size of the mouth and the small size of the pharyngeal cavity (according to his reconstruction), thus no need for a descended larynx to fit the entire tongue inside the mouth. He claimed that they were anatomically unable to produce the sounds /a/, /i/, /u/, /ɔ/, /g/, and /k/ and thus lacked the capacity for articulate speech, though were still able to speak at a level higher than non-human primates. However, the lack of a descended larynx does not necessarily equate to a reduced vowel capacity. The 1983 discovery of a Neanderthal hyoid bone—used in speech production in humans—in Kebara 2 which is almost identical to that of humans suggests Neanderthals were capable of speech. Also, the ancestral Sima de los Huesos hominins had humanlike hyoid and ear bones, which could suggest the early evolution of the modern human vocal apparatus. However, the hyoid does not definitively provide insight into vocal tract anatomy. Subsequent studies reconstruct the Neanderthal vocal apparatus as comparable to that of modern humans, with a similar vocal repertoire. In 2015, Lieberman hypothesized that Neanderthals were capable of syntactical language, although nonetheless incapable of mastering any human dialect.

It is debated if behavioural modernity is a recent and uniquely modern human innovation, or if Neanderthals also possessed it.

Religion

Funerals

Claims that Neanderthals held funerals for their dead with symbolic meaning are heavily contested and speculative. Although Neanderthals did bury their dead, at least occasionally—which may explain the abundance of fossil remains— it is not indicative of a religious belief of life after death, as such burial could have also had non-symbolic motivations, such as great emotion or to prevent scavenging.

Estimates made regarding the number of known Neanderthal burials range from thirty-six to sixty. The oldest confirmed burials do not seem to occur before approximately 70,000 years ago. The small number of recorded Neanderthal burials implies that the activity was not particularly common. The setting of inhumation in Neanderthal culture largely consisted of simple, shallow graves and pits. Sites such as La Ferrassie in France or Shanidar in Iraq may imply the existence of mortuary centers or cemeteries in Neanderthal culture due to the number of individuals found buried at them.

The debate on Neanderthal funerals has been active since the 1908 discovery of La Chapelle-aux-Saints 1 in a small, artificial hole in a cave in southwestern France, very controversially postulated to have been buried in a symbolic fashion. Another grave at Shanidar Cave, Iraq, was associated with the pollen of several flowers that may have been in bloom at the time of deposition—yarrow, centaury, ragwort, grape hyacinth, joint pine, and hollyhock. The medicinal properties of the plants led American archaeologist Ralph Solecki to claim that the man buried was some leader, healer, or shaman, and that "The association of flowers with Neanderthals adds a whole new dimension to our knowledge of his humanness, indicating that he had 'soul' ". However, it is also possible the pollen was deposited by a small rodent after the man's death.

The graves of children and infants, especially, are associated with grave goods such as artefacts and bones. The grave of a newborn from La Ferrassie, France, was found with three flint scrapers, and an infant from  Cave, Syria, was found with a triangular flint placed on its chest. A 10-month-old from Amud Cave, Israel, was associated with a red deer mandible, likely purposefully placed there given other animal remains are now reduced to fragments. Teshik-Tash 1 from Uzbekistan was associated with a circle of ibex horns, and a limestone slab argued to have supported the head. A child from Kiik-Koba, Crimea, Ukraine, had a flint flake with some purposeful engraving on it, likely requiring a great deal of skill. Nonetheless, these contentiously constitute evidence of symbolic meaning as the grave goods' significance and worth are unclear.

Cults
It was once argued that the bones of the cave bear, particularly the skull, in some European caves were arranged in a specific order, indicating an ancient bear cult that killed bears and then ceremoniously arranged the bones. This would be consistent with bear-related rituals of modern human Arctic hunter-gatherers, but the alleged peculiarity of the arrangement could also be well-explained by natural causes, and bias could be introduced as the existence of a bear cult would conform with the idea that totemism was the earliest religion, leading to undue extrapolation of evidence.

It was also once thought that Neanderthals ritually hunted, killed, and cannibalised other Neanderthals and used the skull as the focus of some ceremony. In 1962, Italian palaeontologist Alberto Blanc believed a skull from Grotta Guattari, Italy, had evidence of a swift blow to the head—indicative of ritual murder—and a precise and deliberate incising at the base to access the brain. He compared it to the victims of headhunters in Malaysia and Borneo, putting it forward as evidence of a skull cult. However, it is now thought to have been a result of cave hyaena scavengery. Although Neanderthals are known to have practiced cannibalism, there is unsubstantial evidence to suggest ritual defleshing.

In 2019, Gibraltarian palaeoanthropologists Stewart, Geraldine, and Clive Finlayson and Spanish archaeologist Francisco Guzmán speculated that the golden eagle had iconic value to Neanderthals, as exemplified in some modern human societies because they reported that golden eagle bones had a conspicuously high rate of evidence of modification compared to the bones of other birds. They then proposed some "Cult of the Sun Bird" where the golden eagle was a symbol of power. There is evidence from Krapina, Croatia, from wear use and even remnants of string, that suggests that raptor talons wore worn as personal ornaments.

Interbreeding

Interbreeding with modern humans 

The first Neanderthal genome sequence was published in 2010, and strongly indicated interbreeding between Neanderthals and early modern humans. The genomes of all non-sub-Saharan populations contain Neanderthal DNA. Various estimates exist for the proportion, such as 1–4% or 3.4–7.9% in modern Eurasians, or 1.8–2.4% in modern Europeans and 2.3–2.6% in modern East Asians. Pre-agricultural Europeans appear to have had similar percentages to modern East Asians, and the numbers may have decreased in the former due to dilution with a group of people which had split off before Neanderthal introgression. Typically, studies have reported finding no significant levels of Neanderthal DNA in Subsaharan Africans, but a 2020 study detected 0.3-0.5% in the genomes of five African sample populations, likely the result of Eurasians back-migrating and interbreeding with Africans, as well as human-to-neanderthal gene flow from dispersals of Homo sapiens preceding the larger Out-of-Africa migration. Such low percentages of Neanderthal DNA in all present day populations indicate infrequent past interbreeding, unless interbreeding was more common with a different population of modern humans which did not contribute to the present day gene pool. Of the inherited Neanderthal genome, 25% in modern Europeans and 32% in modern East Asians may be related to viral immunity. In all, approximately 20% of the Neanderthal genome appears to have survived in the modern human gene pool.

However, due to their small population and resulting reduced effectivity of natural selection, Neanderthals accumulated several weakly harmful mutations, which were introduced to and slowly selected out of the much larger modern human population; the initial hybridised population may have experienced up to a 94% reduction in fitness compared to contemporary humans. By this measure, Neanderthals may have substantially increased in fitness. A 2017 study focusing on archaic genes in Turkey found associations with coeliac disease, malaria severity, and Costello syndrome. Nonetheless, some genes may have helped modern East Asians adapt to the environment; the putatively Neanderthal Val92Met variant of the MC1R gene, which may be weakly associated with red hair and UV radiation sensitivity, is primarily found in East Asian, rather than European, individuals. Some genes related to the immune system appear to have been affected by introgression, which may have aided migration, such as OAS1, STAT2, TLR6, TLR1, TLR10, and several related to immune response. In addition, Neanderthal genes have also been implicated in the structure and function of the brain, keratin filaments, sugar metabolism, muscle contraction, body fat distribution, enamel thickness, and oocyte meiosis. Nonetheless, a large portion of surviving introgression appears to be non-coding ("junk") DNA with few biological functions.

Due to the absence of Neanderthal-derived mtDNA (which is passed on from mother to child) in modern populations, it has been suggested that the progeny of Neanderthal females who mated with modern human males were either rare, absent, or sterile—that is to say, admixture stems from the progeny of Neanderthal males with modern human females. Due to the lack of Neanderthal-derived Y-chromosomes in modern humans (which is passed on from father to son), it has also been suggested that the hybrids that contributed ancestry to modern populations were predominantly females, or the Neanderthal Y-chromosome was not compatible with H. sapiens and became extinct.

According to linkage disequilibrium mapping, the last Neanderthal gene flow into the modern human genome occurred 86–37 thousand years ago, but most likely 65–47 thousand years ago. It is thought that Neanderthal genes which contributed to the present day human genome stemmed from interbreeding in the Near East rather than the entirety of Europe. However, interbreeding still occurred without contributing to the modern genome. The approximately 40,000 year old modern human Oase 2 was found, in 2015, to have had 6–9% (point estimate 7.3%) Neanderthal DNA, indicating a Neanderthal ancestor up to four to six generations earlier, but this hybrid population does not appear to have made a substantial contribution to the genomes of later Europeans. In 2016, the DNA of Neanderthals from Denisova Cave revealed evidence of interbreeding 100,000 years ago, and interbreeding with an earlier dispersal of H. sapiens may have occurred as early as 120,000 years ago in places such as the Levant. The earliest H. sapiens remains outside of Africa occur at Misliya Cave 194–177 thousand years ago, and Skhul and Qafzeh 120–90 thousand years ago. The Qafzeh humans lived at approximately the same time as the Neanderthals from the nearby Tabun Cave. The Neanderthals of the German Hohlenstein-Stadel have deeply divergent mtDNA compared to more recent Neanderthals, possibly due to introgression of human mtDNA between 316 and 219 thousand years ago, or simply because they were genetically isolated. Whatever the case, these first interbreeding events have not left any trace in modern human genomes.

Detractors of the interbreeding model argue that the genetic similarity is only a remnant of a common ancestor instead of interbreeding, although this is unlikely as it fails to explain why sub-Saharan Africans do not have Neanderthal DNA.

Interbreeding with Denisovans

Although nDNA confirms that Neanderthals and Denisovans are more closely related to each other than they are to modern humans, Neanderthals and modern humans share a more recent maternally-transmitted mtDNA common ancestor, possibly due to interbreeding between Denisovans and some unknown human species. The 400,000-year-old Neanderthal-like humans from Sima de los Huesos in northern Spain, looking at mtDNA, are more closely related to Denisovans than Neanderthals. Several Neanderthal-like fossils in Eurasia from a similar time period are often grouped into H. heidelbergensis, of which some may be relict populations of earlier humans, which could have interbred with Denisovans. This is also used to explain an approximately 124,000 year old German Neanderthal specimen with mtDNA that diverged from other Neanderthals (except for Sima de los Huesos) about 270,000 years ago, while its genomic DNA indicated divergence less than 150,000 years ago.

Sequencing of the genome of a Denisovan from Denisova Cave has shown that 17% of its genome derives from Neanderthals. This Neanderthal DNA more closely resembled that of a 120,000-year-old Neanderthal bone from the same cave than that of Neanderthals from Vindija Cave, Croatia, or Mezmaiskaya Cave in the Caucasus, suggesting that interbreeding was local.

For the 90,000-year-old Denisova 11, it was found that her father was a Denisovan related to more recent inhabitants of the region, and her mother a Neanderthal related to more recent European Neanderthals at Vindija Cave, Croatia. Given how few Denisovan bones are known, the discovery of a first-generation hybrid indicates interbreeding was very common between these species, and Neanderthal migration across Eurasia likely occurred sometime after 120,000 years ago.

Extinction

Transition

Whatever the cause of their extinction, Neanderthals were replaced by modern humans, indicated by near full replacement of Middle Palaeolithic Mousterian stone technology with modern human Upper Palaeolithic Aurignacian stone technology across Europe (the Middle-to-Upper Palaeolithic Transition) from 41 to 39 thousand years ago. However, it is postulated that Iberian Neanderthals persisted until about 35,000 years ago indicated by the date range of transitional lithic assemblages—Châtelperronian, Uluzzian, Protoaurignacian, and Early Aurignacian. The latter two are attributed to modern humans, but the former two have unconfirmed authorship, potentially products of Neanderthal/modern human cohabitation and cultural transmission. Further, the appearance of the Aurignacian south of the Ebro River has been dated to roughly 37,500 years ago, which has prompted the "Ebro Frontier" hypothesis which states that the river presented a geographic barrier preventing modern human immigration, and thus prolonging Neanderthal persistence. However, the dating of the Iberian Transition is debated, with a contested timing of 43–40.8 thousand years ago at Cueva Bajondillo, Spain. The Châtelperronian appears in northeastern Iberia about 42.5–41.6 thousand years ago.

Some Neanderthals in Gibraltar were dated to much later than this—such as Zafarraya (30,000 years ago) and Gorham's Cave (28,000 years ago)—which may be inaccurate as they were based on ambiguous artefacts instead of direct dating. A claim of Neanderthals surviving in a polar refuge in the Ural Mountains is loosely supported by Mousterian stone tools dating to 34–31 thousand years ago from the northern Siberian Byzovaya site at a time when modern humans may not yet have colonised the northern reaches of Europe; however, modern human remains are known from the nearby Mamontovaya Kurya site dating to 40,000 years ago. Indirect dating of Neanderthals remains from Mezmaiskaya Cave reported a date of about 30,000 years ago, but direct dating instead yielded 39.7±1.1 thousand years ago, more in line with trends exhibited in the rest of Europe.

The earliest indication of Upper Palaeolithic modern human immigration into Europe is the Balkan Bohunician industry beginning 48,000 years ago, likely deriving from the Levantine Emiran industry, and the earliest bones in Europe date to roughly 45–43 thousand years ago in Bulgaria, Italy, and Britain. This wave of modern humans replaced Neanderthals. However, Neanderthals and H. sapiens have a much longer contact history. DNA evidence indicates H. sapiens contact with Neanderthals and admixture as early as 120–100 thousand years ago. A 2019 reanalysis of 210,000 year old skull fragments from the Greek Apidima Cave assumed to have belonged to a Neanderthal concluded that they belonged to a modern human, and a Neanderthal skull dating to 170,000 years ago from the cave indicates H. sapiens were replaced by Neanderthals until returning about 40,000 years ago. This identification was refuted by a 2020 study. Archaeological evidence suggests that Neanderthals displaced modern humans in the Near East around 100,000 years ago until about 60–50 thousand years ago.

Cause

Modern humans
Historically, modern human technology was viewed as vastly superior to that of Neanderthals, with more efficient weaponry and subsistence strategies, and Neanderthals simply went extinct because they could not compete.

The discovery of Neanderthal/modern human introgression has caused the resurgence of the multiregional hypothesis, wherein the present day genetic makeup of all humans is the result of complex genetic contact among several different populations of humans dispersed across the world. By this model, Neanderthals and other recent archaic humans were simply assimilated into the modern human genome – that is, they were effectively bred out into extinction.

Climate change
Their ultimate extinction coincides with Heinrich event 4, a period of intense seasonality; later Heinrich events are also associated with massive cultural turnovers when European human populations collapsed. This climate change may have depopulated several regions of Neanderthals, like previous cold spikes, but these areas were instead repopulated by immigrating humans, leading to Neanderthal extinction.

It has also been proposed that climate change was the primary driver, as their low population left them vulnerable to any environmental change, with even a small drop in survival or fertility rates possibly quickly leading to their extinction. However, Neanderthals and their ancestors had survived through several glacial periods over their hundreds of thousands of years of European habitation. It is also proposed that around 40,000 years ago, when Neanderthal populations may have already been dwindling from other factors, the Campanian Ignimbrite Eruption in Italy could have led to their final demise, as it produced 2–4 °C cooling for a year and acid rain for several more years.

Disease
Modern humans may have introduced African diseases to Neanderthals, contributing to their extinction. A lack of immunity, compounded by an already low population, was potentially devastating to the Neanderthal population, and low genetic diversity could have also rendered fewer Neanderthals naturally immune to these new diseases ("differential pathogen resistance" hypothesis). However, compared to modern humans, Neanderthals had a similar or higher genetic diversity for 12 major histocompatibility complex (MHC) genes associated with the adaptive immune system, casting doubt on this model.

Low population and inbreeding depression may have caused maladaptive birth defects, which could have contributed to their decline (mutational meltdown).

In late-20th-century New Guinea, due to cannibalistic funerary practices, the Fore people were decimated by transmissible spongiform encephalopathies, specifically kuru, a highly virulent disease spread by ingestion of prions found in brain tissue. However, individuals with the 129 variant of the PRNP gene were naturally immune to the prions. Studying this gene led to the discovery that the 129 variant was widespread among all modern humans, which could indicate widespread cannibalism at some point in human prehistory. Because Neanderthals are known to have practised cannibalism to an extent and to have co-existed with modern humans, British palaeoanthropologist Simon Underdown speculated that modern humans transmitted a kuru-like spongiform disease to Neanderthals, and, because the 129 variant appears to have been absent in Neanderthals, it quickly killed them off.

In popular culture

Neanderthals have been portrayed in popular culture including appearances in literature, visual media, and comedy. The "caveman" archetype often mocks Neanderthals and depicts them as primitive, hunchbacked, knuckle-dragging, club-wielding, grunting, nonsocial characters driven solely by animal instinct. "Neanderthal" can also be used as an insult.

In literature, they are sometimes depicted as brutish or monstrous, such as in H. G. Wells' The Grisly Folk and Elizabeth Marshall Thomas' The Animal Wife, but sometimes with a civilised but unfamiliar culture, as in William Golding's The Inheritors, Björn Kurtén's Dance of the Tiger, and Jean M. Auel's Clan of the Cave Bear and her Earth's Children series.

See also
 
 Early human migrations

Footnotes

References

General bibliography

External links

Proof that Neanderthals ate crabs is another 'nail in the coffin' for primitive cave dweller stereotypes - Phys.org February 7, 2023
 
 Human Timeline (Interactive) – Smithsonian, National Museum of Natural History (August 2016).
 : Includes Neanderthal mtDNA sequences
 GenBank records for H. s. neanderthalensis maintained by the National Center for Biotechnology Information (NCBI)

 
Fossil taxa described in 1864
Stone Age Europe
Stone Age Asia